Alessandra Sanguinetti (born 1968) is an American photographer. A number of her works have been published and she is a member of Magnum Photos. She has received multiple awards and grants, including a Guggenheim Fellowship.

Life and work

Born in New York City, Sanguinetti moved to Argentina at the age of two and lived there until 2003. Currently, she lives in California.

Her main bodies of work are The Adventures of Guille and Belinda and the Enigmatic Meaning of their dreams, a more than twenty year long documentary photography project about two cousins—Guillermina and Belinda—as they grow up in the countryside of Buenos Aires; On the Sixth Day, which explores the cycle of life and death through farm animals' lives; Sorry Welcome, a meditative journal on her family life; and Le Gendarme sur la Colline, documenting a road trip through France in 2018.

She has been a member of Magnum Photos since 2007 and is a Magnum Workshop teacher.

Publications

Books of work by Sanguinetti
The Adventures of Guille and Belinda and the Enigmatic Meaning of their Dreams.
Contact Sheet 120. Syracuse, NY: Light Work, 2003. .
Portland, OR: Nazraeli Press, 2010. . With an essay by Gary Hesse.
On the Sixth Day. Portland, OR: Nazraeli, 2005. .
Sorry Welcome. Oakland, CA: TBW, 2013. Subscription Series #4, Book #2. Edition of 1500. Sanguinetti, Christian Patterson, Raymond Meeks and Wolfgang Tillmans each had one book in a set of four.
Le gendarme sur la colline.  Co-published by Aperture and Fondation de l’entreprise Hermès, 2016.
Some Say Ice. London, Mack, 2022. .

Awards
2001: Hasselblad Foundation Grant
2007: MacDowell Fellowship
2008: Guggenheim Fellowship from the John Simon Guggenheim Memorial Foundation
2009: Robert Gardner Fellowship, Harvard Peabody Museum
2009: Photography Grant, National Geographic

Exhibitions

Solo exhibitions 

 The Life that Came, Yossi Milo Gallery, New York, 2008
 Le Gendarme Sur La Colline: Photographs by Alessandra Sanguinetti, Aperture Gallery, New York, 2017

Group exhibitions 

 This Land, Pier 24, San Francisco, CA, 2018/19
 Close Enough: New Perspectives from 12 Women Photographers of Magnum, International Center of Photography, New York, 29 September 2022 – 9 January 2023

References

External links 

Sanguinetti at Magnum Photos

1968 births
Living people
Photographers from New York (state)
21st-century American women photographers
21st-century American photographers
Magnum photographers
Women photojournalists